Wheelchair tennis at the 1988 Summer Paralympics consisted of men's and women's singles events. Despite wheelchair tennis being contested as a demonstration sport, and not an official part of the Paralympic program, medals were awarded and counted for the overall medal list.

Medal summary 

Source: Paralympic.org

References 

 

 
1988 Summer Paralympics events
1988
Paralympics